Ynysboeth (or Ynys-boeth, translated as either 'hot island' or 'burnt river meadow' in Welsh) is a local community within the Mountain Ash (Aberpennar) postal district of the Cynon Valley (Cwm Cynon) in the County Borough of Rhondda Cynon Taf, South East Wales.

The community comprises the village of Ynysboeth itself, as well as the smaller neighbouring associated village of Tyntetown (or 'Tynte') to the north.

The village of Ynysboeth extends from Nant-y-Fedw in the south to Bryntyrion in the north; while Tyntetown comprises the houses along and side streets off of 'Pentwyn Avenue'.

Collectively the population of the area according to the 2011 Census was 2,036.

Geography
Ynysboeth is bounded to the east by the River Cynon, the A4059, 'Coed Fforest Isaf'/'Cefn-Glas'/'Lletty Turner'/'Craig-yr-efail' and by Edwardsville (Quakers Yard) beyond; and to the west by 'Coed Ty-dan Darren'/'Tyntetown Slopes', Cwm Clydach and Llanwonno beyond.

Administration
Although not a part of Abercynon itself, administratively Ynysboeth is grouped within the same electoral ward; however Ynysboeth and Tyntetown are more closely aligned from a social and historic perspective with the nearby community of Penrhiwceiber.

These also fall within the ecclesiastical parish of 'Penrhiwceiber, Matthewstown & Ynysboeth', and together with Penrhiwceiber and the western portion of Mountain Ash form the 'Lower Cynon Cluster'.

Local Amenities
Ynysboeth is home to 'Ynysboeth Community Primary School' (opened in 2013 as a merger and replacement of 'Ynysboeth Junior School' and 'Ynysboeth Infants School', the later of which was destroyed by fire in 2010) and the 'Bryncynon Community Revival Strategy' (set up in 1994).

Other local facilities include 'Ynysboeth Factory Estate', a garage ('Potchy's' formerly 'Bryncynon Service Station'), a 'Gulf' petrol station ('Arya Service Station'), the 'Tynte Hotel P.H.',  'Feel Good Factory' (formerly the 'All Saints Church'), a playground, and some local shops and businesses.

History
Historically Ynysboeth and Tyntetown fell within the parish of Llanwonno within the County of Glamorganshire (specifically Mid Glamorgan), was governed by the 'Mountain Ash Urban District Council', within the 'Pontypridd' Census registration district, and fell within the ecclesiastical parish of 'Penrhiwceiber'.

A separate parish of 'Tyntetown and Ynysboeth' was created in 1923, later regrouped with Penrhiwceiber to become 'Penrhiwceiber, Matthewstown and Ynysboeth' as of 1968, of which they still remain a part of today.

Ynys-boeth
Prior to the end of the C19th the area was rural (viewable on Ordnance Survey (OS) maps of 1884), consisting largely of 'Ynys-boeth-uchaf', 'Ynys-boeth-isaf', 'Aber-nant-y-fedw' and 'Blaen-nant-y-fedw' farms, after which Ynysboeth and the area of 'Nant-y-Fedw' (translated as 'stream of the birch') took its name. Historically Nant-y-Fedw experienced recurring flooding issues, until a major flood alleviation scheme was undertaken by the Council in 2014/2015.

By OS maps of 1901, much of the current village was established with the following roads and streets evident - 'Abercynon Road', 'Battenberg Street', 'Carne Terrace' (later to become 'Cross Street'), 'Cross Street', 'Gloucester Terrace', 'Hartpury Street' (later to become 'Maes y Ffynnon'), 'Itton Street' (later to become 'Caemaen Street'), 'Kennard Street' (later to become 'Avondale Street') and 'Selina Road'.  Also evident from this date are 'Ynysboeth Infants School' and 'Ynys-boeth Quarry'.

According to the 1901 Census, the population of the village at this time was 891.

The area of 'Nant-y-Fedw' was first evident on OS maps from 1953 onwards, while the area of 'Bryntirion' (translated as 'gentle hill' in Welsh) was first evident on OS maps from 1962 onwards. The streets of 'Parry's Drive' and 'Valley View' and the area of 'Maes y Ffynnon' (translated as 'site of the fountain') all being more recent additions to Ynysboeth.

Listed in the 'South Wales & Monmouthshire Trade Directory, 1907', were the following businesses - 'E. Smith' (Grocers), 'E. Smith' (Shopkeepers), 'G. Lewis' (Shopkeepers), 'John Bowen' (Grocers) and 'W. Davies' (Shopkeepers); with the 'Trades' Directory of Wales (North and South), 1918' listing 'Beatall Dairy Co' (Grocers) and 'Wm Taplin' (Cycle Agent).  The village was also previously home to the 'Ynysboeth Hotel'.

Tyntetown (Matthewstown)
Tyntetown meanwhile took its name from the owner of the estate, Halswell Milbourne Kemeys-Tynte, on which the village falls, and after which several of its streets are named.  Prior to the end of the C19th, this area too was rural, comprising mainly 'Pentwyn-isaf' and 'Pentwyn-uchaf' farms, after which the main road through the village ('Pentwyn Avenue') took its name.

Tyntetown has previously been known as 'Matthewstown', believed to be named after a local farmer William Matthews, although this name was never widely adopted and was only correctly renamed to 'Tyntetown' on local road signs as late as 2011.

By OS maps of 1901, most of current day Tyntetown had been established with the following roads/streets evident - 'Abercynon Road' ('Pentwyn Avenue'), 'Bagot Street', 'Haswell Street', 'Homerton Street', 'Milbourne Street' and 'Walsh Street', also evident from this date is the 'Tynte Hotel'.  The only addition being the housing along 'Pentwyn Avenue', the 'Tabernacle Chapel' and the sinking of 'Pentwyn Colliery' as evident on OS maps from 1921 onwards.

The 1901 Census recorded the population of the village (as 'Matthewstown') at this time to be 790.

According to the 'Trades' Directory of Wales (North and South), 1918', the following businesses were listed as within Tyntetown ('Matthewstown') - 'H.J. Crocker' (Grocers), 'H. Dyke' (Butchers), 'Ladd & Sons' (Grocers) and the 'Tynte Hotel' (Inn).

Industrialisation
Following industrialisation, the area previously had its own rail station between 1914 and 1964 named 'Tyntetown Halt' (later referred to as 'Matthewstown Halt'), together with sidings associated with 'Ynys-boeth Quarry' and 'Penrhiwceiber Colliery' (viewable on OS maps between 1901 and 1953) along the Aberdare Branch of the Taff Vale Railway.

The area was also previously linked with the Edwardsville district of Quakers Yard, Treharris, via the 700 yard long Cefn Glas (Quakers Yard) Railway Tunnel built in 1851, which linked the Cynon Valley with Neath and Pontypool via the Newport, Abergavenny and Hereford Branch of the Great Western Railway, and served the nearby Cefn Glas Colliery (sunk in 1863, employing up to 137 men & boys, and closed in 1903).  This was later opened to passenger traffic, before finally being closed in 1964.  Of note, a coal seam running through the tunnel was worked during the 1984-85 miner's strike.

The area was also home to 'Pentwyn (Merthyr) Colliery' (sunk by D. R. Jones in 1920, and viewable on OS maps in the vicinity of Bryntirion, between 1921 and 1956), as well as 'Pentwyn Isha Level' (employing 30 men as of 1918), 'Nantyfedw Level' (employing 8 as of 1938), 'Ynysboeth Level', and numerous other trial levels, quarries and associated tramways within the area.

'Penrikyber Navigation Colliery' ('Penrhiwceiber Colliery') (sunk in 1872, employing up to 2,236 men & boys, and closed in 1985) was located nearby on the outskirts of Tyntetown with Perthcelyn and Penrhiwceiber, and many of the houses in Tyntetown and Ynysboeth were built to house the workforce of this colliery.

Worship
As well as 'All Saints Church' (established 1903), the area was previously home to several places of worship, namely - 'Tabernacle English Baptist Chapel', 'Calvary Welsh Baptist Chapel', 'Hebron Church', 'Carmel English Methodist Church', 'Hermon Calvinistic Methodist Chapel' and 'Bethany Baptist Chapel'.

Notable people
 Robert Pugh (actor)

Gallery

References

Location Grid

Villages in Rhondda Cynon Taf